Natan Felipe Bedriali (born 29 January 2000) is a Brazilian footballer who currently plays for Al Bataeh.

Career statistics

Club

Notes

References

External links

2000 births
Living people
Brazilian footballers
Association football defenders
UAE Pro League players
Esporte Clube XV de Novembro (Jaú) players
Grêmio Esportivo Osasco players
Maringá Futebol Clube players
Al-Wasl F.C. players
Al Bataeh Club players
Expatriate footballers in the United Arab Emirates
Brazilian expatriate sportspeople in the United Arab Emirates